Chapel by the Lake (or Chapel-by-the-Lake) is a Presbyterian church in Auke Bay, Alaska.  It was designed by Juneau-based architects Harold Foss and Linn A. Forrest.  The construction lasted from 1954 to 1958.

Notable features
The Chapel by the Lake is an example of Rustic architecture in a suburban location.  Its rafters, trusses, and walls are visible spruce logs.  A large window behind the altar looks out across Auke Lake to the Mendenhall Glacier.

Services
The chapel is a popular spot for weddings.

A 1992 service at the chapel was held for Karl Reishus, a Juneau Police Department officer who was killed in the line of duty after saving the lives of two firefighters caught in a training accident.

References

External links
Official site

Churches completed in 1958
20th-century Presbyterian church buildings in the United States
Buildings and structures in Juneau, Alaska
Presbyterian churches in Alaska
Rustic architecture in Alaska
Tourist attractions in Juneau, Alaska
1958 establishments in Alaska